Nuculanida is an order of very small saltwater clams, marine bivalve molluscs in the subclass Protobranchia.

Description
These bivalves are distinguished by the presence of relatively primitive, "protobranchiate" gills. There are a row of short teeth along the hinge of the shell. The shells are often internally nacreous.

Families
Families within the order Nuculanida include:
 Bathyspinulidae  Coan & Scott, 1997 
 Lametilidae
 Malletiidae H. and A. Adams, 1858
 Neilonellidae Schileyko, 1989
 Nuculanidae H. Adams & A. Adams, 1858
 Sareptidae  Stoliczka, 1871 
 Siliculidae Allen and Sanders, 1973
 Tindariidae Verrill and Bush, 1897
 Yoldiidae Habe, 1977
 Praenuculidae Mcalester, 1969  (?)
 Pristiglomidae Sanders and Allen, 1973 (?)

References

 
Bivalve orders